Leucotina  is a genus of small sea snails, marine heterobranch gastropod molluscs or micromolluscs in the family Amathinidae.

Species
 Leucotina adamsi Kuroda & Habe, 1971
 Leucotina ampulla Saurin, 1962
 Leucotina casta (A. Adams, 1853)
 Leucotina dianae (A. Adams, 1854)
 Leucotina elongata (van Aartsen, Gittenberger & Goud, 1998)
 Leucotina elongata G. B. Sowerby III, 1892
 Leucotina eva Thiele, 1925
 Leucotina exarata A. Adams, 1860
 † Leucotina granulocostata Laws, 1939 
 Leucotina gratiosa Melvill, 1898
 Leucotina helva Hedley, 1900
 Leucotina insculpta A. Adams, 1860
 Leucotina japonica (A. Adams, 1860)
 Leucotina jaskensis Melvill, 1897
 Leucotina knopi Poppe & Tagaro, 2010
 Leucotina lilyae (van Aartsen, Gittenberger & Goud, 1998)
 Leucotina micra (Pritchard & Gatliff, 1900)
 Leucotina natalensis E. A. Smith, 1910
 † Leucotina ovalis (Hutton, 1885) 
 Leucotina padangensis Thiele, 1925
 † Leucotina praecursoria (Suter, 1917)
 Leucotina punctata A. Adams, 1860
 Leucotina puncturata (E. A. Smith, 1872)
 Leucotina reginae Saurin, 1959
 Leucotina speciosa (A. Adams, 1853)
 Leucotina sulcata A. Adams, 1860
Species brought into synonymy
 Leucotina ambigua (Hutton, 1885): synonym of Leucotina casta (A. Adams, 1853)
 Leucotina amoena (A. Adams, 1853): synonym of Monotygma amoena (A. Adams, 1853)
 Leucotina digitalis (Dall & Bartsch, 1906): synonym of Monotygma amoena (A. Adams, 1853)
 Leucotina esther Angas, 1867: synonym of Leucotina casta (A. Adams, 1853)
 Leucotina formosa W. H. Turton, 1932: synonym of Leucotina elongata G. B. Sowerby III, 1892
 Leucotina niphonensis A. Adams, 1860: synonym of Leucotina dianae (A. Adams, 1854)
 Leucotina sagamiensis Kuroda & Habe, 1971: synonym of Maxacteon sagamiensis (Kuroda & Habe, 1971) (original combination)
 Leucotina sundaica Thiele, 1925: synonym of Leucotina speciosa (A. Adams, 1853)

References

 Hori, S. & Tsuchida, E. (1995). A revision of the systematic position of genus Leucotina Gastropoda: Heterostropha). Venus. 54: 279-293

External links

 Adams, A. (1860). On some new genera and species of Mollusca from Japan. Annals and Magazine of Natural History. (3) 5: 299-303
 Cossmann, M. (1895). Essais de paléoconchologie comparée. Première livraison. Paris, The author and Comptoir Géologique. 159 pp., 7 pls.
 Beu A.G. (2004) Marine Mollusca of oxygen isotope stages of the last 2 million years in New Zealand. Part 1: Revised generic positions and recognition of warm-water and cool-water migrants. Journal of the Royal Society of New Zealand 34(2): 111-265.

Amathinidae